Gulating was one of the first Norwegian legislative assemblies, or things, and also the name of a present-day law court of western Norway. The practice of periodic regional assemblies predates recorded history, and was firmly established at the time of the unification of Norway into a single kingdom (900–1030). These assemblies or lagþings were not democratic, but did not merely serve elites either. They functioned as judicial and legislative bodies, resolving disputes and establishing laws.

Gulaþing, along with Norway's three other ancient regional assemblies, the Borgarting, Eidsivating, and Frostating, were joined into a single jurisdiction during the late 13th century, when King Magnus the Lawmender had the existing body of law put into writing (1263–1280). They provided the institutional and legal framework for subsequent legislative and judicial bodies, and remain in operation today as superior regional courts.

History
The Gulaþing was an annual parliamentary assembly which took place in Gulen, on the west coast of Norway north of Bergen, from approximately 900 to 1300 AD and was one of the oldest and largest parliamentary assemblies in medieval Norway. The Gulatinget Millennium Site is a symbol of the history of this Norwegian representative form of parliament, with traditions reaching over a thousand years back in time.

Initially farmers from Western Norway met at Gulen to discuss political matters, things like taxation, the building of roads and churches, and military service. The assembly also passed judgments in civil disputes and criminal cases. Special legislation, Gulatingslova (the Gulaþing law), was drafted to aid the discussions. A fairly complete manuscript of the legislation from around 1250 has survived, Codex Ranzovianus (E don. var. 137 4to at the Danish Royal Library); however, the text represents all the laws adopted and amended by the farmers at the thing over several centuries.

The assembly site was established early in the 10th century and the original legislative area covered the regions of Hordaland and Sogn og Fjordane. Initially the Gulaþing was an 'allthing' or common assembly, where all free farmers had the right to participate. Snorri Sturlason’s Heimskringla recounts that Håkon the Good (935–961) took an active part in the parliamentary assemblies at Gulen, and under his rule the regions of Rogaland, Agder and Sunnmøre were brought into the area covered by the thing, with Valdres and Hallingdal also being incorporated later.

The practice of periodic regional assemblies of leading men predates recorded history, and was firmly established at the time of the unification of Norway into a single kingdom (900–1030). These assemblies or lagþings, functioned as judicial and legislative bodies, resolving disputes and establishing laws. The Gulaþing received delegates from Lyngør in the south to north of Ålesund, and its laws were observed from the eastern inland valleys of Valdres and Hallingdal to the Faroe Islands in the west.

The Gulaþing served as the model for the establishment of the legislative assemblies of Iceland (the Althing) and of the Faeroe Islands (the Løgting), areas settled by people from western Norway.

While the Gulating was not a democratic assembly in the modern sense of an elected body, it effectively represented the interests of a large number of people rather than a small elite. The laws were typically crafted as social contracts. §35 for instance states, "None of us shall take goods from others, or take the law into our own hands" (Robbestad, 1969). The laws nevertheless applied for every person inside the "law area" Gulaþingslǫg. If a stranger stole from a Gulaþingsman, that was also in breach of the laws, but the law set no limits to how he could be punished.

Gulaþing, along with Norway's three other ancient regional assemblies, the Borgarting, Eidsivating, and Frostating, were joined into a single jurisdiction during the late Viking Age, and King Magnus the Lawmender had the existing body of law put into writing (1263–1280). They provided the institutional and legal framework for subsequent legislative and judicial bodies, and remain in operation today as superior regional courts.

The assembly site was selected as the millennium site for Sogn og Fjordane county.

Judgments
Violence was dealt with by fines, which were imposed not only on the murderer, but also on his relatives—a practice that distinguishes Old Norse law from the Roman practice of holding only the individual responsible. Homicide of an heir to a property, according to Gulaþing law §218-228, is punished by a collective fee of 189 cattle, where each responsible party's share is spelled out in detail.

See also
 Frostathing Law
 Medieval Scandinavian law

References

Other sources
 Larson, Laurence M. (1939) The Earliest Norwegian Laws: being the Gulathing law and the Frostathing law (New York: Columbia University Press)
 Robbestad, Knut (1969) Gulatingloven. (Oslo: Norrøne bokverk. Det Norske Samlaget)

External links
 Gulatinget official website  
 Thingsites.com - Official website for the Northern European Thing sites  

Legal history of Norway
Thing (assembly)
Law of Norway
Millennium sites